Årland is a village in Austevoll municipality in Vestland county, Norway.  The village is located on the southern part of the island of Stolmen, just north of the village of Våge.

References

Villages in Vestland
Austevoll